The  is a Bo-Bo wheel arrangement DC electric locomotive type operated by the private railway operator Chichibu Railway in Saitama Prefecture, Japan, primarily on freight services, since 1967.

, all of the original three locomotives are in operation.

History
Three locomotives, DeKi 301 to 303, were built in 1967. The design was broadly based on the earlier Class DeKi 200 locomotives, with four 230 kW traction motors, although the non-standard bogie design of the DeKi 200 was not used. The cab window sun visors of the DeKi 200 were also discontinued on the DeKi 300.

Fleet details

References

Chichibu Railway
Electric locomotives of Japan
Bo-Bo locomotives
Hitachi locomotives
1067 mm gauge locomotives of Japan
1500 V DC locomotives
Railway locomotives introduced in 1967